The Kankesanthurai Power Station (also commonly referred to as the Koolair Power Station) was a fuel oil-run thermal power station which was commissioned as part of the urgent plan by the Ceylon Electricity Board to overcome the 1990s power crisis. It was the biggest power station in the Jaffna region, at that time.

The operators were unable to repair the damage due to the insurance company rejecting the claim, stating that it was due to war, and not due to terrorism for which it was originally insured for.

History 

Due to the protests and complaints against the high levels of noise of up to 100dB caused by the operation of the Kotte Power Station in the residential area, it was transferred  to its final location at Kankesanthurai in the Jaffna District, in August 1998. The plant operated only for three months in Kotte - generating a total of  prior to transfer.

The Malabe Power Station too faced similar concerns about noise, before changes were made to reduce sound output from 102dB to 49dB. With increasing demand in the Jaffna Peninsula, the facility too was subsequently shifted from Malabe in December 1999, to the newly created facility in Kankesanthurai. Seventeen generators were relocated in a period of three months.

See also 
 List of power stations in Sri Lanka

References

External links 
 
 
 

Oil-fired power stations in Sri Lanka
Buildings and structures in Jaffna District
Former power stations in Sri Lanka